Sir David Roberts McMurtry,  (born 15 March 1940) is an Irish-British billionaire, the co-founder and executive chairman of Renishaw plc, the UK's largest supplier of metrology equipment.  As of October 2021, his net worth was estimated at US$1.3 billion.

Early life
David Roberts McMurtry was born in 1940 in Clontarf, Ireland. He was brought up in Dublin and educated at Mountjoy School (now the Mount Temple Comprehensive School) in Dublin.

Career
McMurtry joined Bristol Aero Engines as an apprentice in 1958. In 1966, following an acquisition, he found himself employed by Rolls-Royce plc where he became Deputy Chief Designer and Assistant Chief of Engine Design at Filton. In 1973, while working on Concorde's engines, he designed his first trigger probe. He worked on the Turbo-Union RB199 engine.

In 1973, he joined his former colleague John Deer to set up Renishaw plc. In 1987, he acquired the patents for his trigger probes from Rolls-Royce plc and began to exploit the patents himself. In 1989, he became a Royal Designer for Industry.

McMurtry was awarded the CBE in 1994 and was knighted in the 2001 New Year Honours.

McMurtry received an honorary doctorate from Heriot-Watt University in 1998. In 2001, McMurtry was elected a Fellow of the Royal Academy of Engineering. In 2008, the University of Bath awarded him an honorary doctorate. In 2011, he was elected a Fellow of the Royal Society. He won the Institute of Physics Swan Medal and Prize in 2012.

In 2018, McMurtry stepped down as chief executive of Renishaw and was replaced by marketing and sales director William Lee.

On 2 March 2021, McMurtry, along with John Deer, indicated that they wished to dispose of their entire holdings in Renishaw, comprising some 53% of the shares, as 'we recognise that neither of us is getting any younger'.  The Renishaw board then announced that it was launching a formal sale process for the entire company. This process was terminated on 7 July 2021, the board concluding that none of the proposals met their objectives.

Personal life
McMurty and his wife, Teresa, have two sons and a daughter. He lives in Wotton-under-Edge, England.

In 2001, McMurtry started work on Swinhay House. Now complete, the "£30m futuristic eco-house" appeared in an episode of the BBC television series Sherlock.

References

External links

1940 births
People from County Dublin
Businesspeople from County Dublin
Bristol Aeroplane Company
Concorde
Irish businesspeople
Irish inventors
Irish industrial designers
20th-century Irish people
21st-century Irish people
People educated at Mount Temple Comprehensive School
Living people
Commanders of the Order of the British Empire
Knights Bachelor
Fellows of the Royal Society
British billionaires
People from Wotton-under-Edge
British inventors
British industrial designers
Panavia Tornado
Rolls-Royce people
20th-century British businesspeople
21st-century British businesspeople